Alan Leong Kah-kit (born 22 February 1958), SC is a former member of the Hong Kong Legislative Council, representing the Kowloon East geographical constituency, and the sitting-Chairman of the Civic Party. He was also vice-chairperson of the Independent Police Complaints Council.

Early career
Leong graduated with an LLB from the University of Hong Kong and an LLM from Hughes Hall, University of Cambridge. He was chairman of Hong Kong Bar Association from 2001 to 2003.

Political career
As chairperson of Hong Kong Bar Association, he mobilised many barristers to participate in the July 1 protests. He won a seat in the Legislative Council in the 2004 election.

In January 2011, Leong was elected the second leader of the Civic Party, replacing Audrey Eu.

2007 Chief Executive election 
Leong was nominated by the Civic Party as its party candidate for the Chief Executive election in 2007. He was also supported by the pan-democrats, including the Democratic Party.

Leong later secured 132 nominations and became the first Pan-democracy camp candidate to succeed in joining the Chief Executive election. In the end Leong lost to Donald Tsang in the CE election on 25 March 2007, gaining 123 votes from the 800-member Election Committee.

"Five Constituencies Referendum" 

In January 2010, Leong and other four lawmakers, Albert Chan, Tanya Chan, Leung Kwok-hung and Wong Yuk-man resigned their seats to force by-elections, in which they all stood, which they called on to be treated as a referendum to press the Chinese Central Government into allowing universal suffrage in Hong Kong. On 16 May 2010, he was re-elected as a lawmaker in the by-election.

Dissolution of the Civic Party and retirement 
After the Civic Party failed to form a new executive committee in December 2022, Leong stated the party would be dissolved in 2023. He also announced his intention to retire from politics after the party's dissolution, saying he was "old enough to retire as a politician".

Personal life
Leong is married with three children.

References

External links

Personal website
ALSC Chambers
Official website
CE election site
Official blog 

1958 births
Alumni of the University of Hong Kong
Cantonese people
20th-century Chinese lawyers
21st-century Chinese lawyers
Living people
Hong Kong Senior Counsel
Alumni of Wah Yan
Alumni of Hughes Hall, Cambridge
Charter 08 signatories
Civic Party politicians
HK LegCo Members 2004–2008
HK LegCo Members 2008–2012
HK LegCo Members 2012–2016
Members of the Election Committee of Hong Kong, 2017–2021